The Alcoa 50,000 ton forging press is a heavy press operated at Howmet Aerospace's Cleveland Operations. It was built as part of the Heavy Press Program by the United States Air Force. It was manufactured by Mesta Machinery of West Homestead, Pennsylvania, and began operation on May 5, 1955.

Alcoa ran the plant from the time of its construction, and purchased it outright in 1982. In 2008, cracks were discovered in the press, which had to be shut down for safety reasons. Repairs, originally estimated at a cost of $68 million (equivalent to $ million in ), cost a total of $100 million, and were completed in early 2012.

References

External links

 
 
 

Alcoa
Historic American Engineering Record in Ohio
Industrial machinery